Metro FM is a national radio station in South Africa owned by the South African Broadcasting Corporation. The station broadcasts on FM Stereo as well as the DStv Bouquet Channel 801.
Telephone :

History
The station started broadcasting in October, 1986 as Radio Metro to compete with the now defunct Radio Bop.  Playing a mix of urban contemporary and bubblegum pop Radio Bop was able to reach black audiences in parts of the Transvaal by broadcasting on the AM band from the "independent" bantustan of Bophuthatswana where it was licensed. This prompted the SABC's then white management to launch Radio Metro which was put on air in about six months, from the planning stages.

The station launched the careers of a number of radio celebrities including, Bob Mabena, Shado Twala and Lawrence Dube.

Over the years the station has had a number of competitors, including in the very competitive Johannesburg radio market where two stations, Kaya FM and YFM, launched in mid/late 1990s have taken away some audience from Metro FM.

Metro sponsors the Metro FM Music Awards, the 2016 edition being the 15th. Known as Mabhena FM.

Broadcast time
24/7

Listenership figures

References

External links
Metro FM Website

Radio stations in South Africa
Radio stations established in 1986
1986 establishments in South Africa
Radio stations in Johannesburg